The 2021 Open Quimper Bretagne II was a professional tennis tournament played on hard courts. It was the twelfth edition of the tournament which was part of the 2021 ATP Challenger Tour. It took place in Quimper, France between 1 and 7 February 2021.

Singles main-draw entrants

Seeds

1 Rankings as of 25 January 2021.

Other entrants
The following players received wildcards into the singles main draw:
  Arthur Cazaux
  Antoine Cornut Chauvinc
  Manuel Guinard

The following players received entry into the singles main draw as alternates:
  Maxime Janvier
  Lukáš Lacko

The following players received entry from the qualifying draw:
  Mathias Bourgue
  Evan Furness
  Tobias Kamke
  Matteo Viola

The following player received entry as a lucky loser:
  Daniel Masur

Champions

Singles

  Brandon Nakashima def.  Bernabé Zapata Miralles 6–3, 6–4.

Doubles

 Ruben Bemelmans /  Daniel Masur def.  Brandon Nakashima /  Hunter Reese 6–2, 6–1.

References

2021 ATP Challenger Tour
2021
2021 in French tennis
February 2021 sports events in France